El Kala (Latin Thinisa in Numidia) is a seaport of Algeria, in El Tarf Province, 56 miles (90 km) by rail east of Annaba and 10 miles (16 km) west of the Tunisian frontier. It is the centre of the Algerian and Tunisian coral fisheries and has an extensive industry in the curing of sardines. The harbor is small and exposed to the northeast and west winds.

El Kala attracts tourists from within and outside the country, especially during the summer. It is home to an exceptional ecosystem and was declared a biosphere reserve by UNESCO in 1990.

History

Thinisa in Numidia was an ancient city in the Roman province of Numidia. It was important enough to become a bishopric. The old fortified town was built on a rocky peninsula about 400 metres long, connected with the mainland by a sand bank.

French and Italian coral fishing companies were interested in the area from as early as 1553. A trade bastion called "Bastion de France" by its Corsican founders was established during that period principally for the exploitation of red coral and also to facilitate trade between southern France and that part of northern Algeria. The bastion was shut down and returned to the rule of the Bey of Constantine in 1816.

After the occupation of La Calle by the French in 1836, a new town was built up along the coast.

Titular see of Thinisa in Numidia 
In 1933, the Ancient diocese of Thinisa in Numidia was nominally restored as a Catholic titular see of the lowest (episcopal) rank.

It has had the following incumbents:
 Francesco Venanzio Filippini, Friars Minor (O.F.M.) (1933.05.23 – 1973.03.31)
 Mario Revollo Bravo (1973.11.13 – 1978.02.28) (later Cardinal)
 Javier Lozano Barragán (1979.06.05 – 1984.10.28) (later Cardinal)
 Mario Picchi, Salesians (S.D.B.) (1989.06.19 – 1997.03.29)
 Vincenzo Pelvi (1999.12.11 – 2006.10.14) (later Archbishop of Foggia–Bovino)
 Laurent Chu Văn Minh, Auxiliary Bishop of Hanoi (Vietnam) (2008.10.15 – Present) .

See also
European enclaves in North Africa before 1830

References

Sources

External links 
 El Kala
 GigaCatholic, with titular incumbent biographical links
	

Mediterranean port cities and towns in Algeria
Communes of El Taref Province
El Taref Province